The District Docklands (previously known as Harbour Town) is an indoor/outdoor shopping centre in the suburb of Docklands in the inner-west of Melbourne.

History 
The District Docklands opened on 21 October 2008 as Harbour Town. Following the Harbour Town concept, it was owned by ING Real Estate. Harbour Town featured a ferris wheel known as Southern Star which opened on 20 December 2008 but closed on 30 January 2009 due to structural defects. It reopened on 23 December 2013 and was rebranded as Melbourne Star. American retailer Costco opened its first Australian store at the centre on 17 August 2009.

Since its opening in 2008, Harbour Town struggled to attract visitors and shoppers to the centre due to the close proximity of being located near two DFO outlets and located on the edge of the CBD. In December 2014, real estate investment and advisory group AsheMorgan purchased the centre from ING Real Estate.

A $150 million facelift and rebranding to The District Docklands was announced in August 2017. Swedish retail giant H&M signed on as the first retail anchor tenant and is joined by a number of other popular national youth fashion and lifestyle brands. These changes mark the establishment of Melbourne's latest shopping, entertainment and fresh food precinct. Construction of an eight-cinema Hoyts and an entertainment concept by Funlab was started in May 2017, and opened in mid-2018.

The fresh food marketplace called The District Market, anchored by Woolworths and complemented by a variety of international and local retailers, which formed the final stage of the redevelopment, was completed in mid-2019.

The centre has already undergone an extensive aesthetic upgrade, including the installation of all-weather roofing.

Tenants 
The District Docklands has  of floor space, comprising 80 stores over two levels serviced by 2,818 car spaces. Major retailers in the centre include Costco, Woolworths, Hoyts, H&M, Uniqlo and Dan Murphy's.

Transport 
The District Docklands is the terminal stop for tram routes 35, 70 and 86, running along Docklands Drive to the south of the centre. Bus routes 220, 941 and 942 also serve the shopping centre, running along Footscray Road to the east.

The District Docklands also has a multi level car park with 2,818 spaces.

References

External links

Shopping centres in Melbourne
Shopping malls established in 2008
2008 establishments in Australia
Buildings and structures in the City of Melbourne (LGA)